Bittacus kimminsi is a species of hangingfly in the family Bittacidae. It is found in the highlands of South Africa (KwaZulu-Natal, Free State and Eastern Cape). Its favoured habitat is grassland, often near wetlands.

References 

Bittacus
Insects of South Africa
Insects described in 1956